Shiner is an American post-hardcore/alternative rock band from Kansas City, Missouri that was active from 1992 to 2003. Since 2012 Shiner has been playing several shows a year. The band's new record Schadenfreude was released May 8, 2020, with touring to follow that was since cancelled due to COVID-19.

History
The group formed in 1992, and quickly found wide exposure, releasing a vinyl EP in 1993 and touring with acts such as Sunny Day Real Estate, Chore, Jawbox, Season to Risk, The Jesus Lizard, and Girls Against Boys. The group released their first LP, Splay (recorded at Steve Albini's Chicago studio) in 1996, and a second album, Lula Divinia the next year. Sub Pop took notice, and released a 7" single of the group's songs "Sleep it Off" and "Half Empty". Following this the band toured with Hum in 1998. A third full-length, Starless, was released on a label run by members of Descendents, Owned and Operated, in 2000. A fourth LP, The Egg, would follow before the group broke up in 2002. This was recorded and produced at Matt Talbott's recording studio, Great Western Record Recorders in Tolono IL and released by DeSoto Records.

Shiner broke up in 2003 after more than a year of touring behind The Egg. Their story was by no means an unusual one; they simply ran their course, building up a cult fanbase in a decade of releasing music, and reaching the logical endpoint of that arc. The album "The Egg" grew an audience over time "Yet a funny thing tends to happen when an album is left alone for several years. As file-sharing and social media grew in the time after The Egg was released, so did its stature"

Josh Newton is the guitar/synth player/mastermind for Sie Lieben Maschinen with Jason Gerken on drums. Allen Epley is in The Life and Times.

Shiner's newest record, Schadenfreude, was released May 8, 2020. The single "Life as a Mannequin" was released February 28, 2020.

The subsequent tour was postponed due to COVID-19.

The band also has the song "Third Gear Scratch" included on the soundtrack of the video game Saints Row 2.

Final show
After announcing that the band was breaking up, Shiner scheduled a final performance. The final show was held at The Madrid Theater in Kansas City on January 25, 2003. Houston, Dirtnap, and Elevator Division opened.

Reunions (2012–present)
Nearly ten years after its final show, Shiner announced a quintet of reunion shows in the US to celebrate the reissue of The Egg on vinyl on August 7, 2012. The dates include stops in NYC, LA, Lawrence, Kansas and Chicago:
8.11 New York, NY – Gramercy
8.18 Los Angeles, CA – Echoplex
8.24 Lawrence, KS – The Granada
8.25 & 26 Chicago, IL – Bottom Lounge

In 2015, the band played a second series of reunion shows in conjunction with a vinyl reissue of Starless: 
7.15 Austin, TX – Red 7
7.17 Kansas City, MO – Record Bar
7.18 Minneapolis, MN – Triple Rock
7.19 Chicago, IL – Empty Bottle
 
In 2016, they played a few shows:
1.14 Pittsburgh, PA – Club Cafe
1.15 New York, NY – St. Vitus
1.16 New York, NY – St. Vitus

2017 saw a similar short US tour in conjunction with the vinyl re-release of Lula Divinia.
2.22 Champaign, IL – Accord
2.24 Kansas City, MO – Record Bar 
2.25 Chicago, IL – Thalia Hall
3.03 San Francisco, CA – Bottom Of The Hill
3.04 Los Angeles, CA – The Echo
3.05 San Diego, CA – The Casbah
9.08 Milwaukee, WI – Shank Hall
9.09 Chicago, IL – Wurst Fest

2018 
9.21 Rock Island, IL – RIBCO
9.22 Kansas City, MO – Record bar
9.23 Chicago, IL – Empty Bottle

Members

Current
Allen Epley (guitar, vocals)
Paul Malinowski (bass, formerly of Season to Risk)
Josh Newton (guitar, formerly of Season to Risk)
Jason Gerken (drums, formerly of Molly McGuire)

Previous members
Jeff Brown (drums)
Tim Dow (drums)
Joel Hamilton (guitar)
Shawn Sherrill (bass)

Discography

Studio albums

Singles and EPs
"Brooks" / "Released" (1993, DeSoto)
"Crush" / "Exhaust" (1994, Hit It!)
"Floodwater" / "Cowboy" (1995, HitIt!)
"Sleep it Off" / "Half Empty" (1997, Sub Pop)
"Farewell Bend Merger" (1998, DeSoto)
"Semper Fi" / "Sailor's Fate" (1999, DeSoto)
"Making Love EP" (2000, Anodyne, reissued in 2007)
"Life as a Mannequin" (2020, Two Black Eyes)
”Paul P Pogh” (2020, Two Black Eyes)
"The One Thing" (2022)

Compilations
 "Only Shallow" on the Soak Your Shoes in Red Wine and Strike the Angels Dumb compilation CD (2003, Grand Theft Autumn)
 "Anytime" (credited as Ohms) on the No Escape: A Tribute to Journey compilation CD-EP (2003, URININE)

References

External links
Official Shiner fan site
Biography from Built on a Weak Spot
2001 interview with Allen Epley
Pitchfork Media review of The Egg
Pitchfork Media review of Starless

American post-hardcore musical groups
Math rock groups
Rock music groups from Missouri
Musical groups established in 1992
Musical groups disestablished in 2003
Musical groups from Kansas City, Missouri
Musical groups reestablished in 2012